Jessica Dawson is a female international table tennis player from England.

Table tennis career
Dawson from Thornaby-on-Tees represented England at the 2012 World Team Table Tennis Championships (Corbillon Cup women's team event) with Joanna Parker Kelly Sibley and Hannah Hicks. The following year she was crowned National Junior champion.

See also
 List of England players at the World Team Table Tennis Championships

References

English female table tennis players
Living people
Year of birth missing (living people)